Girolamo del Prato was an Italian draughtsman, sculptor, niellist, and goldsmith, flourished at Cremona in the first half of the 16th century. He has been sometimes called the Lombard Cellini.

References

Italian draughtsmen
Italian Baroque sculptors
Sculptors from Lombardy
Italian male sculptors
Artists from Cremona
Year of death unknown
Year of birth unknown